Cameron Mackenzie may refer to:
 Cameron Mackenzie (athlete)
 Cameron Mackenzie (politician)
 Cameron Mackenzie (footballer)